Henry Abbott (born 18 December 1947) was an Irish High Court judge from 2002 until 18 December 2017.

He was a former Fianna Fáil politician and was first elected to Dáil Éireann as a Fianna Fáil Teachta Dála (TD) at the 1987 general election for the Longford–Westmeath constituency. He lost his seat at the 1989 general election.

References

1947 births
Living people
Fianna Fáil TDs
Local councillors in County Westmeath
20th-century Irish farmers
Irish barristers
Members of the 25th Dáil
Politicians from County Westmeath
High Court judges (Ireland)
21st-century Irish farmers